Birmingham Curzon Street railway station is the planned northern terminus of Phase 1 of High Speed 2 in the city centre of Birmingham, England. Curzon Street will have seven terminal platforms and is planned to open in 2026.

The station, the design for which has been developed by WSP and Grimshaw Architects, will be surrounded by new public spaces, include a pedestrian link to the adjacent  railway station, and be integrated with an extended West Midlands Metro tram network.

Birmingham City Council plans to use the location of the new station to promote development within the city, especially the redevelopment of the Eastside and Digbeth areas.

History

Site

The station will be constructed on land bounded by Curzon Street, Eastside Park & Moor Street Queensway, built partially on the site of the former Curzon Street railway station, historically the first station serving London to Birmingham trains. The remaining Classical stone entrance building is now a Grade I listed building, applied by Historic England for "buildings of exceptional interest".

The site is located to the east of the city centre, in the Eastside and Digbeth areas, in the valley of the River Rea. It was densely developed until the late 20th century and is the most historically industrialised area of the city; the Grand Union Canal arrived in the 18th century, and the London and North Western, Midland and Great Western railways were all built through this part of the city in the 19th century.

The character of the site and surroundings has been in transition in recent years. Eastside has focused on learning and innovation, and is the location of Birmingham City University, Aston University and the ThinkTank science museum. Digbeth is covered by a conservation area, marking it historically important in respect of its distinct character. Digbeth has become an arts and technology hub. The Digbeth Branch Canal is located to the east of the site, connecting to the wider city network.

A large proportion of the site has remained brownfield or car parking, retaining only remnants of its previous industrial use. The site was also the location of the Park Street Gardens Burial Grounds which has been removed as part of the site remediation works. As well as the entrance of the 1838 station, the neighbouring Grade II listed pub, The Woodman, will be incorporated into the redevelopment; the Fox & Grapes, a listed pub previously situated on Park Street, was demolished in 2018, which attracted strong criticism.

Construction

Construction is due to complete in 2026–29.

At the start of 2019, the site was cleared. As at all HS2 sites, site clearance was followed by an extensive archaeological programme, in this case involving 70 archaeologists, which unearthed what is thought to be the world's oldest railway roundhouse adjacent to the old Curzon Street station. Built to a design by the 19th century engineer Robert Stephenson, the roundhouse was operational on 12 November 1837 – predating the current titleholder of "world's oldest" in Derby by almost two years. Other demolitions and ground investigations are preparing the site for construction, and utility diversions are set to begin in summer 2020.

The tender for the main construction contractor was opened by HS2 in January 2020 for £571million. HS2 was forced to halt the original procurement process the previous July due to a "lower-than-anticipated market appetite" from bidders.

In April 2020, planning permission for the new station, including concourses, roof, viaduct, and platforms was granted by the City Council, the first HS2 station to gain it. The Council's report concluded "the [station design is] truly world class. The elegant and (deceptively) simple form of the main station building clearly reads as a railway station and harks back to traditional station architecture, delivering this in a confident and contemporary way".

In June 2020, HS2 announced that Laing O’Rourke, a pairing of Mace and Dragados, and a joint venture between BAM Nuttall and Ferrovial had been shortlisted for the contract to build the station. It was confirmed in May 2021 that Mace Dragados had won the contract, in a deal worth up to £570million. Mace Dragados will work with HS2 Ltd in two stages to finalise the detailed design and then build the station.

Design
The design for Curzon Street station was developed by the consultancy WSP and Grimshaw Architects for High Speed 2. Initial designs were consulted on in autumn 2018 and evolved ones in January 2020. The station building is roughly oriented north east to south west. The railway line will continue eastwards elevated on a viaduct over Park Street and New Canal Street, with retail, trams and public space beneath. The old Curzon Street station will be incorporated into the eastern entrance of the new station and connected using a masonry colonnade screen between the historic structure and the new HS2 station viaducts and eastern concourse at New Canal Street. The renovated building will have a visitor centre and office space that will be
used by HS2 Ltd, Birmingham City University and Historic England.

The design also improves access to different modes of transport: the West Midlands Metro tram service will run alongside and underneath the station, while accessible pedestrian routes lead to local bus services, Sprint rapid transit bus services and train services at the nearby Moor Street railway station. Cycle parking has also been incorporated, providing space for more than 550 bicycles. The new station is planned to be net zero carbon in operation, and is designed to meet BREEAM Excellent, an industry standard for buildings that reduce energy usage and materials waste, and minimise impact on the natural environment.

Services

On completion of the second phase of HS2, there will be nine departures and nine arrivals per hour.

References

High Speed 2
Proposed buildings and structures in Birmingham, West Midlands
Proposed railway stations in England
Transport in Birmingham, West Midlands